The 2014 Desert Diamond Cup was a soccer exhibition featuring five soccer teams from Major League Soccer and one from USL Premier Development League, held between February 19 – March 1, 2014. The preseason tournament was played at the Kino Sports Complex 11,000 seat main stadium in Tucson, Arizona. This was the 4th annual Desert Diamond Cup.

Teams 
The following six clubs participated in the 2014 tournament:
 Chicago Fire (first appearance)
 Chivas USA (first appearance)
 Colorado Rapids (first appearance)
 FC Tucson (second appearance)
 New England Revolution (third appearance)
 Real Salt Lake (third appearance)

Chivas Rayadas de Guadalajara was also announced to play in the final match in place of FC Tucson.

Standings

Matches
The tournament featured a round-robin group stage followed by third-place and championship matches.

Tournament

Finals

References

External links 
 2014 FC Tucson Desert Diamond Cup

2014
Desert Diamond Cup